Willie B. Brown (June 18, 1940 – January 5, 2009) was an American politician who served in the New Jersey General Assembly from the 29th Legislative District from 1974 to 1998.

He died of heart failure on January 5, 2009, in Edison, New Jersey at age 68.

References

1940 births
2009 deaths
Democratic Party members of the New Jersey General Assembly
20th-century American politicians